The SP-18 Onça (Brazilian-Portuguese name for the Jaguar) also known as the IPAI-27 Jipe Voador, was a Brazilian single-seat, single engined experimental agricultural aircraft.

Design and development
Developed by Brazilian engineer Romeu Corsini, it was designed to be an aircraft used in agriculture. It had STOL aircraft capabilities.

The fuselage was made of welded steel tubes, externally covered in canvas, fixed landing gear, a "T" rudder to facilitate low-speed maneuvers, wooden, high-support wing.

Flight testing went on for nearly a decade, and brought a number of improvements to the aircraft. The aircraft was eventually used for studies by aeronautical engineering students from São Carlos, under Corsini's supervision. It ended up influencing the construction of another aircraft, the IPAI-26 Tuca.

Specifications

Notes

References

Single-engined tractor aircraft
High-wing aircraft
1960s Brazilian civil aircraft
1960s Brazilian agricultural aircraft
1960s Brazilian experimental aircraft
Aircraft first flown in 1965